Sylvia Hoeks (born 1 June 1983) is a Dutch actress and former model, best known internationally for her roles in Blade Runner 2049 (2017) and The Girl in the Spider's Web (2018).

Early life and education
Hoeks was raised in Maarheeze, North Brabant, Netherlands.

After finishing high school, she attended the Maastricht Academy of Dramatic Arts.

Besides her native Dutch, Hoeks speaks German, French and English and appears in productions made in those languages.

Career
Hoeks was scouted by Elite Model Management at age 14. Her first job was a cover for Elle Girl, and she traveled Europe as a model for several years while attending high school.

Shortly after graduation from the Maastricht Academy of Dramatic Arts, Hoeks had a main role in the Dutch TV film Staatsgevaarlijk. In 2005, Hoeks appeared as a mistress in the series Gooische Vrouwen and had a main role in the psychological thriller series Vuurzee.

Hoeks' breakthrough was in the Jos Stelling film Duska (2007). She won a Golden Calf (the Dutch equivalent of an Academy Award) for Best Supporting Actress for the role. She next played Julia in The Storm (2009), and the title role in Tirza (2010). Hoeks starred as Johanna van Heesch in The Gang of Oss in 2011, and as Elise in The Girl and Death in 2012. In 2013, she played Claire Ibbetson in the film The Best Offer, her first international role.

Hoeks starred in the Dutch TV drama series  ("Blood relatives") from 2010 to 2014, as well as the Dutch TV thriller series  ("Adultery") from 2011 to 2015.

Hoeks portrayed the replicant Luv in the 2017 science fiction film Blade Runner 2049. She trained with weights and in martial arts for six hours a day, six days a week before and during filming. Hoeks appeared as Lara in the Steven Quale action film Renegades. In February 2017, she was cast as Leigh in All the Devil's Men. In 2018, Hoeks played Lisbeth Salander's sister in the thriller The Girl in the Spider's Web, the sequel to The Girl with the Dragon Tattoo. Beginning in 2019, Hoeks has appeared as Queen Kane in the Apple TV+ drama series See.

Hoeks is starring in  Jordan Scott's upcoming thriller Berlin Nobody, which began shooting in September 2022. The film is produced by Ridley Scott’s Scott Free Productions and also stars Eric Bana and Sadie Sink.

Filmography

Film

Television

Awards
 2007: Golden Calf for Best Supporting Actress for Duska
 2009: Best Actress at the Festroia International Film Festival for The Storm
 2011: Shooting Stars Award
 2014: Sylvia Kristel Award
 2017: IGN's Best of 2017 Award nomination for Best Supporting Performer in a Movie for Blade Runner 2049

References

External links

 

1983 births
Living people
People from Cranendonck
Maastricht Academy of Dramatic Arts alumni
21st-century Dutch actresses
Dutch female models
Dutch film actresses
Dutch stage actresses
Dutch television actresses